The diocese of Cagli e Pergola was a Roman Catholic ecclesiastical territory in the Marche, central Italy, in the province of Pesaro and Urbino.  Up until 1563 it was under the direct supervision of the Roman pontiff.  In that year, the diocese of Urbino was elevated to metropolitan status, and Cagli became a suffragan see of Urbino.  The diocese was abolished as an independent entity in 1986, when it was incorporated into the diocese of Fano-Fossombrone-Cagli-Pergola. It was still a suffragan of the archdiocese of Urbino.

The historical diocese of Cagli was renamed in 1819. Pergola, which had been in the diocese of Urbino, was raised to the rank of an episcopal city and united to the See of Cagli.

History

Bishop Egidio (1243–59) had many controversies with the municipality of Gubbio. Under his successor the Ghibellines revolted against the papal power. After the death of Bishop Jacopo (1276), the Ghibelline canons wished to elect a noble, Berardo Berardi, while the Guelphs elected Rinaldo Sicardi, Abbot of San Pietro di Massa. As a result the see remained vacant for some years. Finally Berardo was made bishop of Osimo, and Sicardi died, whereupon a certain Guglielmo was elected bishop (1285). Civil discords, however, did not cease, and after a terrible massacre, Cagli was burned by its own citizens.

It was afterwards rebuilt on the plain of St. Angelo, and Pope Nicholas IV named it St. Angelo of the Pope (S. Angelo papale). Later on, however, the original name of Cagli was substituted.

In 1297 the first stone of the cathedral was laid by the Bishop Lituardo Cervati, and in 1398 Niccolò Marciari brought the building to completion. In 1503 the partisans of Cesare Borgia killed the Franciscan bishop Gasparo Golfi. His successor, a Spanish Dominican, Ludovico di Lagoria, was nearly killed by the people.

End of the diocese
In a decree of the Second Vatican Council, it was recommended that dioceses be reorganized to take into account modern developments. A project begun on orders from Pope John XXIII, and continued under his successors, was intended  to reduce the number of dioceses in Italy and to rationalize their borders in terms of modern population changes and shortages of clergy. The change was made urgent because of changes made to the Concordat between the Italian State and the Holy See on 18 February 1984, and embodied in a law of 3 June 1985. The reorganization was approved by Pope John Paul II in an audience of 27 September 1986, and by a decree of the Sacred Congregation of Bishops of the Papal Curia on 30 September 1986. The diocese of Fano was united to the dioceses of Cagli e Pergola and of Fossombrone. Its name was to be Fanensis-Forosemproniensis-Calliensis-Pergulanus. The seat of the diocese was to be in Fano. The former cathedral in Cagli and the former cathedral in Fossombrone were to have the honorary title of co-cathedral, and their chapters were to be called the "Capitulum Concathedralis". There was to be only one episcopal curia, one seminary, one ecclesiastical tribunal; and all the clergy were to be incardinated in the diocese of Fano-Fossombrone-Caglia-Pergola. The combined diocese was suffragan of the Archdiocese of Urbino-Urbania-Sant'Angelo in Vado. The diocese of Cagli ceased to exist.

Bishops

Diocese of Cagli
Erected: 4th Century
Latin Name: Calliensis
Metropolitan: Archdiocese of Urbino (from 1563)

Gratianus (ca. 359)
...
Viticianus (ca. 500) 
...
Anastasius (ca. 731)
...?
Rodulphus (ca. 761)
...
Luitulphus ( – 1045)
Marcus (by 1050 – 1058)
Hugo, O.S.B. (1059 – 1128)
Quiricus (1128 – 1156)
Ranerius, O.S.B (1156 – 1175)
Allodericus (ca. 1175 – 1211)
Anselmus (1217 – )
Albertus (1229 – )
Aegidius, O.S.B. (1233 – 1259)
Thomas Morandus, O.P. (1259 – 1265)
Hugolinus Acquaviva (1266 – ca. 1269)
Jacobus (1270 – 1276)

...
Giovanni Buono de Lutiis (3 November 1413 – 1429)
Genesius da Parma (7 December 1429 – 1439)
Antonio Severini (14 Dec 1439 - 15 Jul 1444 Appointed, Bishop of Gubbio)
Simone Pauli (14 Oct 1444 - Oct 1460 Died)
Bartolomeo Torelli, O.P. (23 Jul 1494 - 1496 Died)
Gaspare Golfi, O.F.M. (5 May 1498 - 1503 Died)
Ludovico de Lagoria, O.P. (8 Mar 1503 - 13 Feb 1504 Appointed, Bishop of Lavello)
Bernardino de Leis, C.R.L. (23 Feb 1504 - 6 Jan 1506 Died)
Antonio Castriani (Antonio Crastini), O.F.M. (17 Mar 1506 - 21 May 1507 Appointed, Bishop of Montefeltro)
Giorgio Benigno Salviati, O.F.M. (21 May 1507 - 1513 Appointed, Titular Archbishop of Nazareth)
Tommaso Albini (Tommaso Albizi), O.P. ( 1513 - 1524 Resigned)
Cristoforo Guidalotti Ciocchi del Monte (10 Feb 1525 - 27 Jun 1550 Appointed, Bishop of Marseille)
Giovanni Ciocchi del Monte (27 Jun 1550 - 10 Aug 1554 Died)
Cristoforo Guidalotti Ciocchi del Monte (9 Mar 1556 - 27 Oct 1564 Died)
Giovanni Battista Torleoni (7 Feb 1565 - 20 Jul 1567 Died)
Paolo Maria della Rovere (8 Oct 1567 - 1591 Died)
Ascanio Libertano (Ascanio Libertani) (19 Jul 1591 - 10 Mar 1607 Died)
Timocrate Aloigi (Democrate Aloisi) (14 May 1607 - 17 Feb 1610 Died)
Filippo Bigli (Bili), C.R. (17 May 1610 - 24 Aug 1629 Died)
Giovanni Francesco Passionei (3 Dec 1629 - 27 Nov 1641 Appointed, Bishop of Pesaro)
Pacifico Trani (Trasi), O.F.M. (24 Mar 1642 - 31 Dec 1659 Died)
Castracane De' Castracani (5 May 1660 - 17 Oct 1669 Died)
Andrea Tamantini (6 Oct 1670 - Mar 1685 Died)
Giulio Giacomo Castellani, O.S.A. (1 Apr 1686 - Jan 1694 Died)
Benedetto Luperti (19 Apr 1694 - 23 Sep 1709 Died)
Alfonso De' Bellincini (7 Apr 1710 - 12 Jun 1721 Died)
Gianfrancesco De’ Bisleti (24 Sep 1721 - 9 Dec 1726 Appointed, Bishop of Segni)
Girolamo Maria Allegri, O.S.M. (9 Dec 1726 - 5 Jul 1744 Died)
Silvestro Lodovico Paparelli (7 Sep 1744 - 6 Oct 1754 Died)
Lodovico Agostino Bertozzi (16 Dec 1754 - 20 Sep 1802 Died)
Alfonso Cingari (31 Mar 1806 - 14 Jun 1817 Died)
Carlo Monti (25 May 1818 - 7 Jan 1842 Died)

Diocese of Cagli e Pergola
Name Changed: 18 January 1819
Latin Name: Calliensis e Pergulanus
Metropolitan: Archdiocese of Urbino

Bonifacio Cajani (22 Jul 1842 - 9 Jun 1863 Died)
Francesco Andreoli (21 Dec 1863 - 9 May 1875 Died)
Luigi Raffaele Zampetti (5 Jul 1875 - 29 Sep 1876}
Gioachino Cantagalli (29 Sep 1876 - 10 Nov 1884 Appointed, Bishop of Faenza)
Giovanni Battista Scotti (10 Nov 1884 - 18 May 1894
Giuseppe Maria Aldanesi (18 Mar 1895 - 16 May 1906 Resigned)
Ettore Fronzi (12 Sep 1908 - 14 Dec 1918 Appointed, Archbishop of Camerino)
Augusto Curi (23 Dec 1918 - 5 May 1925 Appointed, Archbishop of Bari-Canosa)
Giuseppe Venturi (9 Jul 1926 - 18 Feb 1931 Appointed, Archbishop of Chieti)
Filippo Mantini (22 Jun 1931 - 13 Mar 1939 Died)
Raffaele Campelli (8 Aug 1939 - 15 Jan 1977 Retired)
Costanzo Micci (15 Jan 1977 - 4 Sep 1985 Died)
Mario Cecchini (11 Feb 1986 - 30 Sep 1986 Appointed, Bishop of Fano-Fossombrone-Cagli-Pergola)

30 September 1986: United with the Diocese of Fano and the Diocese of Fossombrone to form the Diocese of Fano-Fossombrone-Cagli-Pergola

References

Books
  (in Latin)

Studies

Lanzoni, Francesco (1927). Le diocesi d'Italia dalle origini al principio del secolo VII (an. 604). Faenza: F. Lega. 
Schwartz, Gerhard (1907). Die Besetzung der Bistümer Reichsitaliens unter den sächsischen und salischen Kaisern: mit den Listen der Bischöfe, 951-1122. Leipzig: B.G. Teubner. pp. 241–242. (in German)

Acknowledgment

Cagli
Roman Catholic dioceses in le Marche
Religious organizations established in 1819
1819 establishments in Italy